Ernesto Tornquist Provincial Park is a provincial protected area in the south of Buenos Aires Province, mid-eastern Argentina. Established on 23 April 1958, it covers a small area of the Ventania System.

References

External links
 
 Parque Provincial Ernesto Tornquist 

Parks in Argentina
Protected areas of Buenos Aires Province